A stoplight is a traffic signaling device.

Stoplight or Stop light may also refer to:
Stop light party, a party where guests wear different colors
Stoplight loosejaw, a deep-sea dragonfish
Stoplight parrotfish, a species of marine ray-finned fish
Stoplight Catone, a butterfly of the Nymphalidae
Stop-Light: Five Noh Plays, five verse dramas by Paul Goodman

Animal common name disambiguation pages